Sir Thomas Walsh (before 1346-1397/8) was an English soldier, landowner and politician.

Background and family
The Walsh (Waleys, Wallshe) family was first mentioned in connection with Wanlip in 1248. Thomas was born before 1346, the second son of Sir John Walsh and his wife Alice Cliff.  He is the subject of a detailed and extensively-referenced biography that can be consulted at History of Parliament Online.

Thomas and his wife Katherine had the following children, who are not necessarily all listed in order of their age:
 William
 John
 Thomas
 Margaret – married Sir Thomas Gresley
 Elizabeth – married Sir Thomas Boyville
 Richard

Career
Thomas was part of the retinue of John of Gaunt, when the English army devastated the Pays de Caux in the summer of 1369. The numerous official positions that he held included:
 1373 – Commissioner to distribute tax relief in Leicestershire
 1375 – Escheator of Warwickshire and Leicestershire
 1379 – Surveyor of tax assessments
 1382 – Responsibility for putting down rebellion
 1394 – Constable of Leicester Castle

He was a justice of the peace in Leicestershire in 1381-2 and 1390-4 and Steward of the Duchy of Lancaster in Leicestershire, Northamptonshire, Nottinghamshire, Rutland and Warwickshire from 1392.

Thomas sat as a Member of Parliament for Leicestershire fifteen times between 1371 and January 1397.

Death and monument
Thomas was still living in January 1396/7, when he transferred property at Little Walton at Monks Kirby, Warwickshire and at Leicester and other places in Leicestershire to his son in law Thomas Gresley for the sum of £100, subject to an annuity of £29 yearly being paid to Walsh for the remainder of his life. Thomas Gresley did not have to pay the annuity for long, as his father in law had died by December 1398.

Sir Thomas was buried in Wanlip church, which he and his wife had rebuilt in 1393. The inscription on their monument, which takes the form of a brass set into the floor of the chancel reads:

“Here lyes Thomas Walssh knyght lorde of Anlep and dame Katine his wife whiche in her tyme made the kirke of Anlep and halud the kirkyerd first in Wurchip of god and of oure lady and seynt Nicholas that god have her soules and mercy anno domini millesimo CCC nonagesimo tercio”

This brass is the subject of a detailed article by Nigel Saul, who has commented that it is the earliest extant example of an English inscription on a high-status tomb monument.

References

1398 deaths
English MPs 1371
Year of birth uncertain
People from Wanlip
English MPs 1379
English MPs November 1380
English MPs 1381
English MPs May 1382
English MPs February 1383
English MPs November 1384
English MPs 1386
English MPs February 1388
English MPs January 1390
English MPs November 1390
English MPs 1394
English MPs 1395
English MPs January 1397
Members of the Parliament of England for Leicestershire